George Cornelius Gorham (1787–1857) was a priest in the Church of England. His legal recourse to being denied a certain post, decided subsequently by a secular court, caused great controversy.

Early life
George Cornelius Gorham was born on 21 August 1787 in St Neots, Huntingdonshire, to Mary (née Greame) and George James Gorham. He entered Queens' College, Cambridge, in 1805, graduating with a Bachelor of Arts degree as third wrangler and Smith's prizeman in 1809.

He was ordained as a deacon on 10 March 1811, despite the misgivings of the Bishop of Ely, Thomas Dampier, who found Gorham's opinions at odds with Anglican doctrine. Gorham's views on baptism had caused comment, particularly his contention that by baptism infants do not become members of Christ and the children of God. After being ordained as a priest on 23 February 1812 and serving as a curate in several parishes, he was instituted as vicar of St Just in Penwith by Henry Phillpotts, Bishop of Exeter, in 1846.

Controversy
In 1847 Gorham was presented by the Earl of Cottenham, the Lord Chancellor, to the vicarage of Brampford Speke, a parish in a small Devon village near Exeter, which has a parish church dedicated to Saint Peter. Upon examining him, Bishop Henry Phillpotts took exception to Gorham's view that baptismal regeneration was conditional and dependent upon a later personal adoption of promises made. The bishop argued that Gorham's Calvinistic view of baptism made him unsuitable for the post. Gorham appealed to the ecclesiastical Court of Arches to compel the bishop to institute him but the court confirmed the bishop's decision and awarded costs against Gorham.

Gorham then appealed to the Judicial Committee of the Privy Council, which caused great controversy about whether a secular court should decide the doctrine of the Church of England. The ecclesiastical lawyer Edward Lowth Badeley, a member of the Oxford Movement, appeared before the committee to argue the bishop's cause, but the committee (in a split decision) eventually reversed the bishop's and the Arches' decision on 9 March 1850 to grant Gorham his institution.

Phillpotts repudiated the judgment and threatened to excommunicate the Archbishop of Canterbury and anyone who dared to institute Gorham. Fourteen prominent Anglicans, including Badeley and Henry Edward Manning, requested that the Church of England repudiate the opinion that the Privy Council had expressed concerning baptism. As there was not any response from the Church apart from Phillpotts' protestations, they quit the Church of England and joined the Roman Catholic Church.

Subsequent life
Gorham himself spent the rest of his life at his post in Brampford Speke. As vicar, Gorham restored the church building, entirely rebuilding the tower, for which Phillpotts gave some money. He was an antiquary and botanist of some reputation, as well as the author of a number of pamphlets. He died on 19 June 1857 in Brampford Speke.

Publications
 George Cornelius Gorham, The History and Antiquities of Eynesbury and St. Neot's, in Huntingdonshire, and of St. Neot's in the county of Cornwall, 1820.

See also

 Canon law of the Church of England
 Diocese of Exeter

References

Citations

Works cited

Further reading

External links
Documents connected with the Gorham Controversy from Project Canterbury
George C. Gorham letter, 1856 at Pitts Theology Library, Candler School of Theology

1787 births
1857 deaths
19th-century English Anglican priests
Alumni of Queens' College, Cambridge
Clergy from Devon
Fellows of Queens' College, Cambridge
Evangelical Anglican clergy
People from St Neots